The Dutch Eredivisie in the 1984–85 season was contested by 18 teams. Ajax won the championship.

League standings

Results

See also
 1984–85 Eerste Divisie
 1984–85 KNVB Cup

References

 Eredivisie official website - info on all seasons 
 RSSSF

Eredivisie seasons
Netherlands
1